Medeiros may refer to:

People

Elli Medeiros, Uruguayan singer and actress
Glenn Medeiros (born 1970), American singer and songwriter
Humberto Sousa Medeiros (1915–1983), American Catholic Cardinal
SuperGirlKels (Kelsy Medeiros, born 1988), Canadian esports player
Léo Medeiros (born 1981), Brazilian footballer
Leonardo Medeiros (born 1964), Brazilian actor
Lionel Medeiros (born 1977), Portuguese footballer
Maria de Medeiros (born 1965), Portuguese actress
Medeiros e Albuquerque (1867–1934), Brazilian author
Melody Medeiros (born 1983), American professional wrestler
Mr. J. Medeiros, American rapper, record producer, and songwriter
Rodrigo Medeiros, Brazilian jiu-jitsu world champion
Teresa Medeiros (born 1962), American writer
Thiago Medeiros (born 1982), Brazilian racecar driver
Celestino Medeiros, New England criminal executed with Sacco and Vanzetti
Yancy Medeiros (born 1987), MMA fighter

Places
Medeiros, Minas Gerais, town in Brazil
Vila Medeiros (district of São Paulo), Brazil
Medeiros Neto, municipality in Bahia, Brazil

Music
Medeiros (album), 1997 recording by the American band Wheat
Glenn Medeiros (1987 album), eponymous 1987 recording

See also
Mederos, the Spanish-language variant

Portuguese-language surnames